The little paradise-kingfisher (Tanysiptera hydrocharis) is a species of bird in the family Alcedinidae.
It is found in the Aru Islands and southern New Guinea.

Description 
It is similar to the common paradise kingfisher, albeit smaller. The juvenile is grey-brown with buff undersides. Its short tail is blue.

References

little paradise kingfisher
Birds of the Aru Islands
Birds of New Guinea
little paradise kingfisher
little paradise kingfisher
Taxonomy articles created by Polbot